You Have Seen Their Faces is a book by photographer Margaret Bourke-White and novelist Erskine Caldwell. It was first published in 1937 by Viking Press, with a paperback version by Modern Age Books following quickly. Bourke-White and Caldwell married in 1939.

Contents
For this pictorial survey about rural American South and its troubles, Bronx-born Bourke-White took the pictures, while Georgia-born Caldwell wrote the text.  Together, they both wrote captions:

Bourke-White lay in wait for her subjects with a flash, and wrote with pleasure of having them "imprisoned on a sheet of film before they knew what had happened." The resulting portraits are by turns sentimental and grotesque, and she and Caldwell printed them with contrived first-person captions.

This book inspired James Agee to write Let Us Now Praise Famous Men (1941).

Title
The book's title is reminiscent of two short stories by Whittaker Chambers in The New Masses:  "Can You Make Out Their Voices" (March 1931) and "You Have Seen the Heads" (April 1931). The former story  Hallie Flanagan (later director of the WPA's Federal Theatre Project) made into a popular play under the title "Can You Hear Their Voices?"

See also
 Whittaker Chambers
 Bibliography for Whittaker Chambers
 Hallie Flanagan

References

External links
 Library of Congress
 You Have Seen Their Faces first edition dustjacket at the NYPL Digital Gallery
 Google Books
 Encyclopædia Britannica
 Art Icono – photos by Margaret Bourke-White
 University of Virginia – photos by Margaret Bourke-White
 Monroe Gallery – photo by Margaret Bourke-White
 New Yorker – "It Happened One Decade" (September 21, 2009)

1937 non-fiction books
Books about the United States
Viking Press books
Works by Erskine Caldwell
Photographic collections and books